Joyce Carol Oates (born June 16, 1938) is an American writer. Oates published her first book in 1963, and has since published 58 novels, a number of plays and novellas, and many volumes of short stories, poetry, and non-fiction. Her novels Black Water (1992), What I Lived For (1994), and Blonde (2000), and her short story collections The Wheel of Love (1970) and Lovely, Dark, Deep: Stories (2014) were each finalists for the Pulitzer Prize. She has won many awards for her writing, including the National Book Award, for her novel them (1969), two O. Henry Awards, the National Humanities Medal, and the Jerusalem Prize (2019).

Oates taught at Princeton University from 1978 to 2014, and is the Roger S. Berlind '52 Professor Emerita in the Humanities with the Program in Creative Writing. Since 2016, she has been a visiting professor at the University of California, Berkeley, where she teaches short fiction in the spring semesters.

Oates was elected to the American Philosophical Society in 2016.

Early life and education
Oates was born in Lockport, New York, the eldest of three children of Carolina (née Bush), a homemaker of Hungarian descent, and Frederic James Oates, a tool and die designer. She grew up on her parents' farm outside the town.

Her brother, Fred Jr., and sister, Lynn Ann, were born in 1943 and 1956, respectively. (Lynn Ann has autism and institutionalized, and Oates has not seen her since 1971.) Oates grew up in the working-class farming community of Millersport, New York, and characterized hers as "a happy, close-knit and unextraordinary family for our time, place and economic status", but her childhood as "a daily scramble for existence". Her paternal grandmother, Blanche Woodside, lived with the family and was "very close" to Joyce. After Blanche's death, Joyce learned that Blanche's father had killed himself, and Blanche had subsequently concealed her Jewish heritage; Oates eventually drew on aspects of her grandmother's life in writing the novel The Gravedigger's Daughter (2007).

Violence marred the lives of Oates and her recent ancestors: Oates's mother's biological father was murdered in 1917, which led to Oates mother's informal adoption; and Oates's paternal grandmother survived, at age fourteen, an attempted murder-suicide at the hands of her own father. As a child, Oates’s next-door neighbor pled guilty to charges of arson and attempted murder of his family, and was sentenced to a prison term at Attica Correctional Facility.

Oates attended the same one-room school her mother had attended as a child. She became interested in reading at an early age and remembers Blanche's gift of Lewis Carroll's Alice's Adventures in Wonderland (1865) as "the great treasure of my childhood, and the most profound literary influence of my life. This was love at first sight!" In her early teens, she read the work of Charlotte Brontë, Emily Brontë, Fyodor Dostoevsky, William Faulkner, Ernest Hemingway, and Henry David Thoreau, writers whose "influences remain very deep". 

Oates began writing at the age of 14, when Blanche gave her a typewriter. Oates later transferred to several bigger, suburban schools and graduated from Williamsville South High School in 1956, where she worked for her high school newspaper. She was the first in her family to complete high school.

As a teen, Oates also received early recognition for her writing by winning a Scholastic Art and Writing Award.

University
Oates earned a scholarship to attend Syracuse University, where she joined Phi Mu. She found Syracuse to be "a very exciting place academically and intellectually", and trained herself by "writing novel after novel and always throwing them out when I completed them". It was at this point that Oates began reading the work of Franz Kafka, D. H. Lawrence, Thomas Mann, and Flannery O'Connor, and she noted, "these influences are still quite strong, pervasive". At the age of 19, she won the "college short story" contest sponsored by Mademoiselle. Oates was elected to Phi Beta Kappa as a junior and graduated valedictorian from Syracuse University with a B.A. summa cum laude in English in 1960, and received her M.A. from the University of Wisconsin–Madison in 1961. She was a Ph.D. student at Rice University but left to become a full-time writer.

Evelyn Shrifte, president of the Vanguard Press, met Oates soon after Oates received her master's degree. "She was fresh out of school, and I thought she was a genius", Shrifte said. Vanguard published Oates' first book, the short-story collection By the North Gate, in 1963.

Career
The Vanguard Press published Oates' first novel, With Shuddering Fall (1964), when she was 26 years old. In 1966, she published "Where Are You Going, Where Have You Been?", a short story dedicated to Bob Dylan and written after listening to his song "It's All Over Now, Baby Blue". The story is loosely based on the serial killer Charles Schmid, also known as "The Pied Piper of Tucson". It has been anthologized many times and adapted as a 1985 film, Smooth Talk, which starred Laura Dern. In 2008, Oates said that of all her published work, she is most noted for "Where Are You Going, Where Have You Been?"

Another early short story, "In a Region of Ice" (The Atlantic Monthly, August 1966), features a young, gifted Jewish-American student. It dramatizes his drift into protest against the world of education and the sober, established society of his parents, his depression, and eventually murder-cum-suicide. It was inspired by a real-life incident (as were several of her works) and Oates had been acquainted with the model of her protagonist. She revisited this subject in the title story of her collection Last Days: Stories (1984). "In the Region of Ice" won the first of her two O. Henry Awards.

Her second novel was A Garden of Earthly Delights (1967), first of the so-called Wonderland Quartet published by Vanguard 1967–71. All were finalists for the annual National Book Award. The third novel in the series, them (1969), won the 1970 National Book Award for Fiction. It is set in Detroit during a time span from the 1930s to the 1960s, most of it in black ghetto neighborhoods, and deals openly with crime, drugs, and racial and class conflicts. Again, some of the key characters and events were based on real people whom Oates had known or heard of during her years in the city. Since then she has published an average of two books a year. Frequent topics in her work include rural poverty, sexual abuse, class tensions, desire for power, female childhood and adolescence, and occasionally the 'fantastic'. Violence is a constant in her work, even leading Oates to have written an essay in response to the question, "Why Is Your Writing So Violent?"

In 1990, she discussed her novel, Because It Is Bitter, and Because It Is My Heart, which also deals with themes of racial tension, and described "the experience of writing [it]" as "so intense it seemed almost electric". She is a fan of poet and novelist Sylvia Plath, describing Plath's sole novel The Bell Jar as a "near perfect work of art", but though Oates has often been compared to Plath, she disavows Plath's romanticism about suicide, and among her characters, she favors cunning, hardy survivors, both women and men. In the early 1980s, Oates began writing stories in the Gothic and horror genres; in her foray into these genres, Oates said she was "deeply influenced" by Kafka and felt "a writerly kinship" with James Joyce.

In 1996, Oates published We Were the Mulvaneys, a novel following the disintegration of an American family, which became a best-seller after being selected by Oprah's Book Club in 2001. We Were the Mulvaneys was eventually turned into a TV movie, which was nominated for several awards. In the 1990s and early 2000s, Oates wrote several books, mostly suspense novels, under the pen names Rosamond Smith and Lauren Kelly.

Since at least the early 1980s, Oates has been rumored to be a favorite to win the Nobel Prize in Literature by oddsmakers and critics. Her papers, held at Syracuse University, include 17 unpublished short stories and four unpublished or unfinished novellas. Oates has said that most of her early unpublished work was "cheerfully thrown away".

One review of Oates's 1970 story collection The Wheel of Love characterized her as an author "of considerable talent" but at that time "far from being a great writer".

Oates's 2006 short story "Landfill" was criticized because it drew on the death, several months earlier, of John A. Fiocco Jr., a 19-year-old New Jersey college student.

In 1998, Oates received the F. Scott Fitzgerald Award for Achievement in American Literature, which is given annually to recognize outstanding achievement in American literature.

Ontario Review
Oates founded The Ontario Review, a literary magazine, in 1974 in Canada, with Raymond J. Smith, her husband and fellow graduate student, who would eventually become a professor of 18th-century literature. Smith served as editor of this venture, and Oates served as associate editor. The magazine's mission, according to Smith, the editor, was to bridge the literary and artistic culture of the US and Canada: "We tried to do this by publishing writers and artists from both countries, as well as essays and reviews of an intercultural nature." In 1978, Sylvester & Orphanos published Sentimental Education.

In 1980, Oates and Smith founded Ontario Review Books, an independent publishing house. In 2004, Oates described the partnership as "a marriage of like minds – both my husband and I are so interested in literature and we read the same books; he'll be reading a book and then I'll read it – we trade and we talk about our reading at meal times ...".

Teaching career
Oates taught in Beaumont, Texas, for a year, then moved to Detroit in 1962, where she began teaching at the University of Detroit. Influenced by the Vietnam war, the 1967 Detroit race riots, and a job offer, Oates moved across the river into Canada in 1968 with her husband, to a teaching position at the University of Windsor in Ontario. In 1978, she moved to Princeton, New Jersey, and began teaching at Princeton University.

Among others, Oates influenced Jonathan Safran Foer, who took an introductory writing course with Oates in 1995 as a Princeton undergraduate. Foer recalled later that Oates took an interest in his writing and his "most important of writerly qualities, energy," noting that she was "the first person to ever make me think I should try to write in any sort of serious way. And my life really changed after that." Oates served as advisor for Foer's senior thesis, which was an early version of his novel Everything Is Illuminated (published to acclaim in 2002).

Oates retired from teaching at Princeton in 2014 and was honored at a retirement party in November of that year.

Oates has taught creative short fiction at UC Berkeley since 2016 and offers her course in spring semesters.

Views

Religion
Oates was raised Catholic but as of 2007 is an atheist. In an interview with Commonweal magazine, Oates stated, "I think of religion as a kind of psychological manifestation of deep powers, deep imaginative, mysterious powers which are always with us."

Politics
Oates self-identifies as a liberal, and supports gun control. She was a vocal critic of former US President Donald Trump and his policies, both in public and on Twitter.

Oates opposed the shuttering of cultural institutions on Trump's inauguration day as a protest against the President, stating this "would only hurt artists. Rather, cultural institutions should be sanctuaries for those repelled by the inauguration."

In January 2019, Oates stated that "Trump is like a figurehead, but I think what really controls everything is just a few really wealthy families or corporations."

Twitter
Oates is a regular poster on Twitter with her account given to her by her publisher HarperCollins. She has drawn particular criticism for the purportedly perceived Islamophobia of her tweets. Oates stated in her criticized tweet, "Where 99.3% of women report having been sexually harassed & rape is epidemicEgyptnatural to inquire: what's the predominant religion?" She later backtracked from that statement. Oates was also criticized for responding to a Mississippi school's pulling of To Kill a Mockingbird from its eighth grade curriculum with a tweet claiming that Mississippians do not read. 

Oates defended her statements on Twitter saying, "I don't consider that I really said anything that I don't feel and I think that sometimes the crowd is not necessarily correct. You know, Kierkegaard said, 'The crowd is a lie.' The sort of lynch mob mentality among some people on Twitter and they rush after somebodythey rush in this direction; they rush over here; they're kind of rushing around the landscape of the news".

Productivity
Oates writes in longhand, working from "8 till 1 every day, then again for two or three hours in the evening." Her prolificacy has become one of her best-known attributes, although often discussed disparagingly. The New York Times wrote in 1989 that Oates's "name is synonymous with productivity", and in 2004, The Guardian noted that "Nearly every review of an Oates book, it seems, begins with a list [of her publication totals]".

In a journal entry written in the 1970s, Oates sarcastically addressed her critics, writing, "So many books! so many! Obviously JCO has a full career behind her, if one chooses to look at it that way; many more titles and she might as well... what?... give up all hopes for a 'reputation'? […] but I work hard, and long, and as the hours roll by I seem to create more than I anticipate; more, certainly, than the literary world allows for a 'serious' writer. Yet I have more stories to tell, and more novels […] ". In The New York Review of Books in 2007, Michael Dirda suggested that disparaging criticism of Oates "derives from reviewer's angst: How does one judge a new book by Oates when one is not familiar with most of the backlist? Where does one start?"

Several publications have published lists of what they deem the best Joyce Carol Oates books, designed to help introduce readers to the author's daunting body of work. In a 2003 article entitled "Joyce Carol Oates for dummies", The Rocky Mountain News recommended starting with her early short stories and the novels A Garden of Earthly Delights (1967), them (1969), Wonderland (1971), Black Water (1992), and Blonde (2000). In 2006, The Times listed them, On Boxing (in collaboration with photographer John Ranard) (1987), Black Water, and High Lonesome: New & Selected Stories, 1966–2006 (2006) as "The Pick of Joyce Carol Oates". In 2007, Entertainment Weekly listed its Oates favorites as Wonderland, Black Water, Blonde, I'll Take You There (2002), and The Falls (2004). In 2003, Oates herself said that she thinks she will be remembered for, and would most want a first-time Oates reader to read, them and Blonde, although she "could as easily have chosen a number of titles."

Bibliography

Oates's extensive bibliography contains poetry, plays, criticism, short stories, eleven novellas, and sixty novels, including Because It Is Bitter, and Because It Is My Heart; Black Water; Mudwoman; Carthage; The Man Without a Shadow; and A Book of American Martyrs. She has published several novels under the pseudonyms Rosamond Smith and Lauren Kelly.

Awards and honors

Winner
 1955–1956: Scholastic Art & Writing Award
 1967: O. Henry Award – "In the Region of Ice"
 1968: M. L. Rosenthal Award, National Institute of Arts and Letters – A Garden of Earthly Delights
 1970: National Book Award for Fiction – them
 1973: O. Henry Award – "The Dead"
 1988: St. Louis Literary Award from the Saint Louis University Library Associates
 1990: Rea Award for the Short Story
 1996: Bram Stoker Award for Novel – Zombie
 1996: PEN/Malamud Award for Excellence in the Art of the Short Story
 1997: Golden Plate Award, American Academy of Achievement
 2002: Peggy V. Helmerich Distinguished Author Award
 2003: Kenyon Review Award for Literary Achievement (The Kenyon Review)
 2005: Prix Femina Etranger – The Falls
 2006: Chicago Tribune Literary Prize (Chicago Tribune)
 2006: Honorary Doctor of Humane Letters, Mount Holyoke College
 2007: Humanist of the Year, American Humanist Association
 2009: Ivan Sandrof Award for Lifetime Achievement, NBCC
 2010: National Humanities Medal
 2010: Fernanda Pivano Award
 2011: Honorary Doctor of Arts, University of Pennsylvania
 2011: World Fantasy Award for Best Short Fiction – Fossil-Figures
 2011: Bram Stoker Award for Best Fiction Collection – The Corn Maiden and Other Nightmares
 2012: Stone Award for Lifetime Literary Achievement, Oregon State University
 2012: Norman Mailer Prize, Lifetime Achievement
 2012: Bram Stoker Award for Best Fiction Collection – Black Dahlia and White Rose: Stories
 2019: Jerusalem Prize, Lifetime Achievement
 2020: Prix mondial Cino Del Duca, work as a message of modern humanism

Finalist

 1970: Pulitzer Prize for Fiction – The Wheel of Love and Other Stories
 1993: Pulitzer Prize for Fiction – Black Water
 1995: Pulitzer Prize for Fiction – What I Lived For
 2001: Pulitzer Prize for Fiction – Blonde
 2015: Pulitzer Prize for Fiction – Lovely, Dark, Deep: Stories

Nominated

 1963: O. Henry Award – Special Award for Continuing Achievement (1970), five Second Prize (1964 to 1989), two First Prize (above) among 29 nominations
 1968: National Book Award for Fiction – A Garden of Earthly Delights
 1969: National Book Award for Fiction – Expensive People
 1972: National Book Award for Fiction – Wonderland
 1990: National Book Award for Fiction – Because It Is Bitter, and Because It Is My Heart
 1992: National Book Critics Circle Award, Fiction – Black Water
 1995: PEN/Faulkner Award – What I Lived For
 2000: National Book Award – Blonde
 2007: National Book Critics Circle Award, Fiction – The Gravedigger's Daughter
 2007: National Book Critics Circle Award, Memoir/Autobiography – The Journal of Joyce Carol Oates: 1973–1982
 2013: Frank O'Connor International Short Story Award for Black Dahlia and White Rose: Stories

Personal life

Oates met Raymond J. Smith, a fellow graduate student, at the University of Wisconsin–Madison, and they married in 1961. Smith became a professor of 18th-century literature and, later, an editor and publisher.  Oates described the partnership as "a marriage of like minds..." and "a very collaborative and imaginative marriage".

Smith died of complications from pneumonia on February 18, 2008, and the death affected Oates profoundly. In April 2008, Oates wrote to an interviewer, "Since my husband's unexpected death, I really have very little energy [...] My marriagemy love for my husbandseems to have come first in my life, rather than my writing. Set beside his death, the future of my writing scarcely interests me at the moment."

After six months of near suicidal grieving for Smith, Oates met Charles Gross, a professor in the Psychology Department and Neuroscience Institute at Princeton, at a dinner party at her home. In early 2009, Oates and Gross were married. On April 13, 2019, Oates announced via Twitter that Gross had died at the age of 83.

As a diarist, Oates began keeping a detailed journal in 1973, documenting her personal and literary life; it eventually grew to "more than 4,000 single-spaced typewritten pages". In 2008, Oates said she had "moved away from keeping a formal journal" and instead preserved copies of her e-mails.

As of 1999, Oates remained devoted to running, of which she has written, "Ideally, the runner who's a writer is running through the land- and cityscapes of her fiction, like a ghost in a real setting". While running, Oates mentally envisions scenes in her novels and works out structural problems in already-written drafts; she formulated the germ of her novel You Must Remember This (1987) while running, when she "glanced up and saw the ruins of a railroad bridge", which reminded her of "a mythical upstate New York city in the right place".

Oates was a member of the board of trustees of the John Simon Guggenheim Memorial Foundation from 1997 to 2016. She is an honorary member of the Simpson Literary Project, which annually awards the $50,000 Simpson/Joyce Carol Oates Literary Prize to a mid-career writer. She has served as the Project's artist-in-residence several times.

References

External links

 Celestial Timepiece: A Joyce Carol Oates Patchwork (Official Web Site)
 Joyce Carol Oates Biography and Interview on American Academy of Achievement
 The Glass Ark: A Joyce Carol Oates Bibliography
  Ontario Review
 
 
 Papers of Joyce Carol Oates at Syracuse University
 Interview with the Oxonian Review in June 2010
 Joyce Carol Oates Bookworm Interviews (Audio) with Michael Silverblatt
 Interview October 13, 2015 WNYC Leonard Lopate show
 Biography at Narrative Magazine
 
 

1938 births
20th-century American dramatists and playwrights
20th-century American educators
20th-century American essayists
20th-century American novelists
20th-century American poets
20th-century American short story writers
20th-century American women writers
20th-century atheists
20th-century memoirists
20th-century pseudonymous writers
21st-century American dramatists and playwrights
21st-century American educators
21st-century American essayists
21st-century American non-fiction writers
21st-century American novelists
21st-century American poets
21st-century American short story writers
21st-century American women writers
21st-century atheists
21st-century memoirists
21st-century pseudonymous writers
Academics from Michigan
Academics from New Jersey
Academics from New York (state)
American atheism activists
American atheists
American bibliophiles
American critics of Islam
American educators
American women educators
American former Christians
American humanists
American literary critics
American women literary critics
American literary theorists
American memoirists
American people of Hungarian descent
American people of Jewish descent
American secularists
American social commentators
American speculative fiction writers
American women academics
American women dramatists and playwrights
American women essayists
American women non-fiction writers
American women novelists
American women poets
American women short story writers
American writers of young adult literature
Critics of religions
Critics of the Catholic Church
Former Roman Catholics
Jerusalem Prize recipients
Literacy and society theorists
Living people
The Magazine of Fantasy & Science Fiction people
Magic realism writers
Members of the American Academy of Arts and Letters
Members of the American Philosophical Society
Mensans
National Book Award winners
National Humanities Medal recipients
Novelists from Michigan
Novelists from New Jersey
Novelists from New York (state)
O. Henry Award winners
PEN/Faulkner Award for Fiction winners
PEN/Malamud Award winners
People from Lockport, New York
Poets from New York (state)
Princeton University faculty
Prix Femina Étranger winners
Pseudonymous women writers
American psychological fiction writers
Rice University alumni
Secular humanists
Syracuse University College of Arts and Sciences alumni
Theorists on Western civilization
University of California, Berkeley faculty
University of Detroit Mercy faculty
University of Wisconsin–Madison alumni
Weird fiction writers
World Fantasy Award-winning writers
Writers about activism and social change
Writers about religion and science
Writers of Gothic fiction
Writers of historical fiction set in the modern age